The Financial Crimes Enforcement Network (FinCEN) is a bureau of the United States Department of the Treasury that collects and analyzes information about financial transactions in order to combat domestic and international money laundering, terrorist financing, and other financial crimes.

Mission
FinCEN's director expressed its mission in November 2013 as "to safeguard the financial system from illicit use, combat money laundering and promote national security." FinCEN serves as the U.S. Financial Intelligence Unit (FIU) and is one of 147 FIUs making up the Egmont Group of Financial Intelligence Units. FinCEN's self-described motto is "follow the money." The website states: "The primary motive of criminals is financial gain, and they leave financial trails as they try to launder the proceeds of crimes or attempt to spend their ill-gotten profits." It is a network bringing people and information together, by  coordinating information sharing with law enforcement agencies, regulators and other partners in the financial industry.

History
FinCEN was established by order of the Secretary of the Treasury (Treasury Order Numbered 105-08) on April 25, 1990. In May 1994, its mission was broadened to include regulatory responsibilities, and in October 1994 the Treasury Department's precursor of FinCEN, the Office of Financial Enforcement was merged with FinCEN. On September 26, 2002, after Title III of the PATRIOT Act was passed, Treasury Order 180-01 made it an official bureau in the Department of the Treasury.

Since 1995, FinCEN employs the FinCEN Artificial Intelligence System (FAIS).

In September 2012, FinCEN's information technology called FinCEN Portal and Query System migrated with 11 years of data into FinCEN Query, a search engine similar to Google. It is a "one stop shop"  accessible via the FinCEN Portal allowing broad searches across more fields than before and returning more results. Since September 2012 FinCEN generates 4 new reports: Suspicious Activity Report (FinCEN SAR), Currency Transaction Report (FinCEN CTR), the Designation of Exempt Person (DOEP) and Registered Money Service Business (RMSB).

Organization

As of November 2013, FinCEN employed approximately 340 people, mostly intelligence professionals with expertise in the financial industry, illicit finance, financial intelligence, the AML/CFT (money laundering/terrorist financing) regulatory regime, computer technology, and enforcement". The majority of the staff are permanent FinCEN personnel, with about 20 long-term detailees assigned from 13 different regulatory and law enforcement agencies. FinCEN shares information with dozens of intelligence agencies, including the Bureau of Alcohol, Tobacco, and Firearms; the Drug Enforcement Administration; the Federal Bureau of Investigation; the U.S. Secret Service; the Internal Revenue Service; the Customs Service; and the U.S. Postal Inspection Service.

FinCEN Directors
 Brian M. Bruh (1990–1993)
 Stanley E. Morris (1994–1998)
 James F. Sloan (April 1999 – October 2003)
 William J. Fox (December 2003 – February 2006)
 Robert W. Werner (March 2006 – December 2006)
 James H. Freis, Jr. (March 2007 – August 2012) 
 Jennifer Shasky Calvery (September 2012 – May 2016)
 Jamal El-Hindi (Acting, June 2016 – November 2017)
 Kenneth Blanco (November 2017 – April 2021) 
 Michael Mosier (April 2021 - August 2021)
 Himamauli Das (Acting, August 2021 – Present)

314 program
The 2001 USA PATRIOT Act required the Secretary of the Treasury to create a secure network for the transmission of information to enforce the relevant regulations. FinCEN's regulations under Section 314(a) enable federal law enforcement agencies, through FinCEN, to reach out to more than 45,000 points of contact at more than 27,000 financial institutions to locate accounts and transactions of persons that may be involved in terrorist financing and/or money laundering. A web interface allows the person(s) designated in §314(a)(3)(A) to register and transmit information to FinCEN. The partnership between the financial community and law enforcement allows disparate bits of information to be identified, centralized, and rapidly evaluated.

Hawala
As early as 2003 FinCEN disseminated information on "informal value transfer systems" (IVTS), including hawala, a network of people receiving money for the purpose of making the funds payable to a third party in another geographic location,... generally tak[ing] place outside of the conventional banking system through non-bank financial institutions or other business entities whose primary business activity may not be the transmission of money. On September 1, 2010, FinCEN issued a guidance on IVTS referencing United States v. Banki and hawala.

Virtual currencies
In July 2011, FinCEN added "other value that substitutes for currency" to its definition of money services businesses in preparation to adapt the respective rule to virtual currencies.  On March 18, 2013 FinCEN issued a guidance regarding virtual currencies, according to which, exchangers and administrators, but not users of convertible virtual currency are considered money transmitters, and must comply with rules to prevent money laundering/terrorist financing ("AML/CFT") and other forms of financial crime, by record-keeping, reporting and registering with FinCEN. Jennifer Shasky Calvery, director of FinCEN said, "Virtual currencies are subject to the same rules as other currencies. … Basic money services business rules apply here."

At a November 2013 Senate hearing, Calvery stated, "It is in the best interest of virtual currency providers to comply with these regulations for a number of reasons. First is the idea of corporate responsibility," contrasting Bitcoin's understanding of a peer to peer system bypassing corporate financial institutions. She stated that FinCEN collaborates with the Federal Financial Institutions Examination Council, a congressionally-chartered forum called the "Bank Secrecy Act (BSA) Advisory Group" and BSA Working Group to review and discuss new regulations and guidance, with the FBI-led "Virtual Currency Emerging Threats Working Group" (VCET) formed in early 2012, the FDIC-led "Cyber Fraud Working Group", the Terrorist Financing & Financial Crimes-led "Treasury Cyber Working Group", and with a community of other financial intelligence units. According to the Department of Justice, VCET members represent the FBI, the Drug Enforcement Administration, multiple U.S. Attorney's Offices, and the Criminal Division's Asset Forfeiture and Money Laundering Section and Computer Crime and Intellectual Property Section.

Controversies
In 2009, the GAO found "opportunities" to improve "interagency and state examination coordination", noting that the federal banking regulators issued an interagency examination manual, that SEC, CFTC, and their respective self-regulatory organizations developed Bank Secrecy Act (BSA) examination modules, and that FinCEN and IRS examining nonbank financial institutions issued an examination manual for money services businesses. Therefore multiple regulators examine compliance of the BSA across industries and for some larger holding companies even within the same institution. Regulators need to promote greater consistency, coordination and information-sharing, reduce unnecessary regulatory burden, and find concerns across industries. FinCEN estimated that it would have data access agreements with 80 percent of state agencies that conduct BSA examinations after 2012.

Since FinCEN's inception in 1990 the Electronic Frontier Foundation in San Francisco has debated its benefits compared to its threat to privacy. FinCEN does not disclose how many Suspicious Activity Reports result in investigations, indictments or convictions, and no studies exist to tally how many reports are filed on innocent people. FinCEN and money laundering laws have been criticized for being expensive and relatively ineffective, while violating Fourth Amendment rights, as an investigator may use FinCEN's database to investigate people instead of crimes.

It has also been alleged that FinCEN's regulations against structuring are enforced unfairly and arbitrarily; for example, it was reported in 2012 that small businesses selling at farmers' markets have been targeted, while politically connected people like Eliot Spitzer were not prosecuted. Spitzer's reasons for structuring were described as "innocent".

In February 2019, it was reported that Mary Daly, the oldest daughter of United States Attorney General William Barr, is to leave her position at the United States Deputy Attorney General's office for a FinCEN position.

In September 2020, findings based on a set of 2,657 documents including 2121 suspicious activity reports (SARs) leaked from FinCEN were published as the FinCEN Files. The leaked documents showed that although both FinCEN and the banks that filed SARs knew about billions of dollars in dirty money being moved through the banks, both did very little to prevent the transactions.

In popular culture 
The 2016 film The Accountant features a FinCEN investigation into the title character.

In the first episode of the 2017 Netflix show Ozark, FinCEN is mentioned as one of the agencies (along with the DEA, ATF, and FBI) active in monitoring cartel activity in Chicago.

See also 

 Casino regulations under the Bank Secrecy Act
 Currency transaction report
 FINTRAC – Canada's equivalent to FinCEN
 Suspicious activity report
 Timeline of post-election transition following Russian interference in the 2016 United States elections
 Timeline of investigations into Trump and Russia (January–June 2017)
 Timeline of investigations into Trump and Russia (July–December 2018)
 Title 31 of the Code of Federal Regulations

References

External links 
 
 FinCEN in the Federal Register

1990 establishments in Washington, D.C.
Federal law enforcement agencies of the United States
Financial crime prevention
Financial regulatory authorities of the United States
Fraud organizations
Tax evasion in the United States
Counterterrorism in the United States
United States Department of the Treasury
Vienna, Virginia
Banking crimes
Government by algorithm